Goplana is an 1896 Polish opera by Władysław Żeleński, to a Polish libretto by Ludomil German after  on the 1839 drama Balladyna by Juliusz Słowacki.

Plot
The folk tale plot follows closely Juliusz Słowacki's original drama and concerns the brutal fate of several humans - principally the sisters Balladyna and Alina - after the nymph Goplana interferes in their affairs.

Recording
DVD Goplana Soloists, Polish National Opera, Grzegorz Nowak, Frederick Chopin Institute 2021

References

External links 
 Goplana in digital library Polona

Operas
1897 operas
Polish-language operas